Sammy Brown (born April 17, 1990) is an American football outside linebacker who is currently a free agent. He was most recently a member of the Ottawa Redblacks of the Canadian Football League (CFL). He was signed by the Rams as an undrafted free agent in 2012. He played college football for the University of Houston after transferring from Mississippi Gulf Coast Community College.

He has also played for the Miami Dolphins.

College career
Brown attended Stone County High School in Wiggins, Mississippi. He spent his first two college seasons competing at Gulf Coast Community College, where he totaled 64 tackles, one forced fumble, and two interceptions. He transferred to the University of Houston for the spring semester of his sophomore season and participated in spring practice. In his junior season, he played in all 12 games, starting 11 of them. He led Conference USA and finished fifth in the NCAA in tackles for loss with 20. He finished the season with 76 total tackles.
In his senior season, Brown played in all 14 of Houston's games, and finished with 93 total tackles, 30 tackles for loss, and 13.5 sacks. Brown's 30 tackles for loss ranked second in the NCAA.

Professional career

St. Louis Rams
On May 5, 2012, he was signed by the Rams as an undrafted free agent. At the conclusion of 2012 training camp, Brown was released with the intention of him clearing waivers and being re-signed to the practice squad. However, he was picked up by the Miami Dolphins on waivers.

Miami Dolphins
Brown was claimed on waivers by the Dolphins on September 1, 2012. He was a healthy inactive in the team's season opener versus the Houston Texans. After 10 days with the team, Brown was released on September 11, 2012.

St. Louis Rams (II) 
On September 14, the Rams brought Brown back, signing him to their practice squad. Brown became notable during the team's week 7 preparation, when Rams coach Jeff Fisher had Brown practice while wearing a long blond wig to emulate Green Bay Packers linebacker Clay Matthews. Brown was elevated to the active roster on November 30, 2012, to give the team a full group of linebackers in the absence of the injured Mario Haggan. He was once again released on August 26, 2014.

Winnipeg Blue Bombers 
Added to the Winnipeg Blue Bombers (CFL) roster on May 14, 2015. Released a month later, on June 15, 2015.

Edmonton Eskimos 
Signed to the practice roster of the Edmonton Eskimos (CFL) on September 15, 2015. Released on October 2, 2015.

Saskatchewan Roughriders 
Was on the roster of the Saskatchewan Roughriders (CFL), but was transferred to the suspended list on May 29, 2016. He was released by the Riders on June 29, 2016.

Ottawa Redblacks 
Brown signed onto the practice roster of the Ottawa Redblacks (CFL) on September 20, 2016; but was released on October 10, 2016. He was on and off the Redblacks roster for the remainder of the 2016 season and he was eventually released on April 10, 2017.

References

External links
University of Houston bio
St. Louis Rams bio

1990 births
Living people
American football linebackers
Edmonton Elks players
Houston Cougars football players
Sportspeople from Hattiesburg, Mississippi
People from Wiggins, Mississippi
Players of American football from Mississippi
St. Louis Rams players
Ottawa Redblacks players